Sport Vereninging Eendracht Utrecht (in English: Utrecht Concord Sports Club), also known as SVE Utrecht or Eendracht Utrecht, was a Dutch basketball club from Utrecht.

History 
Eendracht Utrecht was the first basketball club outside the city of Amsterdam, to win the Eredivisie the 1966-1967 season. The next season the club took part in the FIBA European Champions Cup where it played in the first round against the defending champions Real Madrid and eliminated with two easy defeats.

Honours 

Dutch League
 Winners (1): 1966-67
Dutch Cup
 Winners (1): 1967-68

European record

References 

Defunct basketball teams in the Netherlands
Sports clubs in Utrecht (city)